Deh-e Nowruz may refer to:

Deh-e Nowruz, Kerman
Deh-e Nowruz, Khuzestan
Deh-e Nowruz, Lorestan